The Best of Jon and Vangelis is a compilation album by the Jon and Vangelis duo, the musical collaboration between Yes frontman Jon Anderson and Greek synthesizer musician, Vangelis. Released in 1984 by Polydor Records, the album features songs from their first three studio albums: Short Stories, The Friends of Mr Cairo and Private Collection.

It peaked at number 42 in UK and spent 9 weeks in the charts. It was the duo's last charting album in the UK and their lowest peaking album in this country.

Track listing

Personnel 

 Jon Anderson - Composer, Vocals
 Vangelis - Composer, Arranger, Keyboards, Synthesizers, Piano, Electronics
 Carol Kenyon - Backing vocals
 Dick Morrissey - Flute, Saxophone

Production

 Sleeve design - Vangelis and Alwyn Clayden
 Engineer - Raphael Preston and Raine Shine
 Creative assistance - Green Ink
 Producer - Vangelis

Charts

References

External links 
 Review on Allmusic.com

1984 compilation albums
Jon and Vangelis albums
Polydor Records albums